The 2012–13 Basketball League Belgium Division I, for sponsorship reasons named 2012–13 Ethias League, was the 85th season of the top tier basketball league in Belgium. The season started on October 6, 2012 and finished on June 9, 2013. The season ended with the defending champions Telenet Oostende defeating Belfius Mons-Hainaut in three games to win its 14th national title.

Participants 
Belgacom Liège Basket
Belgacom Spirou Basket
Belfius Mons-Hainaut
Generali Okapi Aalstar
Port of Antwerp Giants
Spotter Leuven Bears
Telenet BC Oostende
VOO Verviers-Pepinster

Regular season

Playoffs

Awards

Most Valuable Player
 Matt Lojeski (Telenet Oostende)

Rookie of the Year
 Jean Salumu (Telenet Oostende)

Belgian Player of the Year
 Roel Moors (Port of Antwerp Giants)

References

External links 
 Ethias League

Basketball League Belgium Division I seasons
Belgian
Lea